Annularita is a genus of land snails with an operculum, terrestrial gastropod mollusks in the family Pomatiidae.

Species 
Species within the genus Annularita include:
Annularita majuscula (Morelet, 1851)

References 

Pomatiidae